La Gerbetière is a mansion in the Couëron commune of the Loire-Atlantique départment, 
France. It was the residence of John James Audubon in his youth.

References

Buildings and structures in Loire-Atlantique